Kaikit Wong from the University College London, United Kingdom was named Fellow of the Institute of Electrical and Electronics Engineers (IEEE) in 2016 for contributions to multiuser communication systems and also a Fellow of the Institute of Engineering and Technology.

References 

Fellow Members of the IEEE
Living people
People associated with University College London
English engineers
Chinese engineers
Alumni of the Hong Kong University of Science and Technology
Year of birth missing (living people)